Youssef Chahed (born 18 September 1975) is a Tunisian politician who served as the 14th Prime Minister of Tunisia from 27 August 2016 to 27 February 2020. Previously he was Secretary of State for Fishing from 2015 to 2016 and Minister of Local Affairs in 2016. He was a member of the Nidaa Tounes party until he formed Tahya Tounes. By profession, he is an agricultural engineer, researcher and university professor. He was elected president of the newly founded Tahya Tounes party on 2 June 2019.

Education and career
Born in Tunis in 1975, Youssef Chahed studied to become an agricultural engineer at the National Agricultural Institute of Tunisia, where he graduated as valedictorian in 1998.

He then joined the Institut National Agronomique Paris-Grignon in France. He graduated in 1999, obtaining a postgraduate diploma (DEA) in environmental economics and resource and in 2003 a PhD in Agricultural Economics under the direction of Jean-Christophe Bureau. The title of his DEA was "Measuring the impact on the welfare of tariff cuts on agricultural products: an application of the Trade Restrictiveness Index (TRI) to the economy of the European Union," and his doctoral thesis was on "measuring the impact of agricultural trade liberalization on trade and welfare".

Until 2009, he taught agricultural economics at the Higher Institute of Agriculture in France and in other countries as a visiting professor. He speaks Arabic, French, English, and Italian fluently.

Prime Minister
On 6 August 2016, after President of the Government Habib Essid overwhelmingly lost a confidence vote in parliament, Chahed was nominated by the Nidaa Tounes party to succeed Essid as President of the Government. On 26 August 2016, his Government was approved by the Assembly of People's Representatives with 167 votes in favour out of 194 votes cast and he was therefore appointed Prime Minister by the President of Tunisia, Beji Caid Essebsi. Chahed has been described as "previously unknown" in the political scene before this role.

Nate Grubman, a scholar at Stanford University, writes about Chahed's tenure as prime minister:"As prime minister, Chahed initially tried to portray himself as an anticorruption warrior. His first shot was the arrest of businessman Chafik Jarraya and a number of others allegedly involved in smuggling. But it was difficult to discern whether Chahed's move against Jarraya was a neutral application of the law or an attempt to hamstring his political rivals."In 2019, the Chahed government banned the burka after the 2019 Tunis bombings. The same year, Chahed announced his candidacy for the Tunisian presidency.

Austerity

In 2018 protests erupted as a reaction to the newly passed Finance Act which took effect on 1 January, that raised taxes on gasoline, phone cards, housing, internet usage, hotel rooms and foods such as fruits and vegetables. Customs taxes on cosmetics and some agricultural products were also raised.

The Popular Front, an alliance of leftist opposition parties, called for continued protests against the government's "unjust" austerity measures while Tunisian Prime Minister Youssef Chahed denounced the violence and appealed for calm, claiming that he and his government believes that 2018 "would be the last difficult year for the Tunisians".

References

External links 

1975 births
Living people
Nidaa Tounes politicians
Prime Ministers of Tunisia
Environmental economists
People from Tunis
21st-century Tunisian politicians